International Virtual Aviation Organisation VZW (IVAO) is a non-profit association which operates a free-of-charge online flight-simulation network.
Following free registration users can connect to the IVAO Network (IVAN) either as a virtual air traffic controller or as a virtual pilot and engage and interact with each other in a massively multiplayer environment utilising real-world aviation procedures, phraseology and techniques.

Overview
IVAO, with more than 240,000 registered members, is one of the largest online flight simulation networks that allow users to act as either a virtual pilot or air traffic controller.
IVAO relies solely on software developed by its own staff of volunteers. Air Traffic Controllers can connect to the IVAO network using IVAO's radar client IvAc, or Aurora - The IVAO ATC Client, that emulates the interface of a modern, real-world air traffic control radar scope. Pilots can connect using their flight simulator and the built-in pilot client, IvAp or Altitude - The IVAO Pilot Client. All pilots and ATC thereby interact on a dedicated, one-world server environment that simulates world-wide air traffic on an "as real as it gets" basis.
While the largest part of IVAO's active membership is based in Europe, new divisions are continually being created to spread the network coverage world-wide.

IVAO logs all flight and controlling hours and offers its members to obtain virtual pilot and ATC ranks by undergoing training and passing theoretical and practical exams based around real-world aviation regulations and procedures. A fully integrated VA system offers virtual airlines the ability to operate on the IVAO Network even with fictional airline callsigns and liveries. Events and regular gatherings are organised on a daily basis by divisions or members. With approximately 8,000 connections per day and an average weekday peak between 700 and 1,500 simultaneous connections, IVAO reached its current simultaneous connection record during the annual "Crowded Skies" event on December 10, 2016, with 3,004 members flying or controlling at the same time. In the latest event of the same name, however, held in 2021, IVAO was far from reaching that number again followed by severe issues in their servers.

History
The first steps for setting up flight simulation in a massively-multiplayer online environment were taken with the creation of SquawkBox and ProController in the mid-1990s. These two programs were connected to FSD, a simple flight simulator multiplayer server, which allowed the evolution from a one-to-one (one ATC and one plane) environment to a many-to-many environment.

Using these programs, SATCO (now VATSIM) was the first large network to create an online air traffic simulation environment. On December 16, 1998, IVAO was founded when a group of people left SATCO to form a new network after management conflicts developed within the organisation.
In late 2005, another management conflict, this time within the IVAO organisation, led to a further split. The incumbent president of IVAO continued with IVAO.org, while other members of management continued the organisation under IVAO.aero.
In 2007, IVAO was officially registered as a non-profit organisation under Belgian law.

IVAO also has taken part in FlightSimCon 2013, 2014, 2015 and 2016, held in Hartford, Connecticut. In 2021, the North American Division of IVAO represented the network at FlightSimExpo.

The formal status of IVAO has been changed into advertising bureau on September 1, 2015, and therefore IVAO has to pay VAT since October 1, 2015.

In December 2019, IVAO Launched its Official BETA of 3 new pieces of software; Altitude - The IVAO Pilot Client, Aurora - The IVAO ATC Client, and Artifice - The Connector (Formerly IvAI). IVAO utilized its Virtual Sky media platform for the initial news release.

Security breaches and server issues 

In February 2021, a global password reset was issued to all users due to an "unauthorised use of privileged access to IVAO web systems" which led to a security breach that affected its staff members. IVAO claims that this incident did not affect normal users.

As of December 2021, IVAO has been targeted due to the poor quality of their servers, which are currently unable to carry on a large number of connections. In the latest three Crowded Skies Events, where the major aim is to reach a large number of connections, in a charitable joint-venture with Aerosoft, several complaints by members were heard regarding severe instabilities of servers, ranging from voice servers to web servers.

January 2022 saw the release of the first quarter objectives for 2022, in the form of a software roadmap to tackle the issues seen during Crowded Skies event of 2021. Where significant development was announced on IVAO's main software suite. This includes the development of IVAO's new World Servers, Aurora for Mac and Linux and Voice ATIS. Further updates each quarter are due to be released to users announcing updates on the currently released projects, and also the announcement of new projects.

The biggest flaw happened in March 2020 in the so-called Global Online Day event, designed in a way to make people enjoy the online flying during the COVID-19 pandemic. Servers weren't able to handle the already expected large number of connections, crashing multiple times, creating a very bad image on the network stability. This issue is also observed in regular activities not boosted by events, like the common spike observed in weekends.

On April 3, 2022, IVAO's main website and other server services provided by IVAO became unavailable to the public. Three days later, IVAO revealed to have been targeted by a ransomware attack that was able to access its database due to an outdated piece of code in its main website that lead to a security breach, consequentially the data stored in its servers were encrypted and a ransom was requested by the attackers. IVAO did not reveal whether the identity of the attackers was known to them. IVAO also claimed that no user data was gathered by its attackers. As soon as IVAO published its statement regarding the ransomware attack, a DDoS attack was launched against its websites that had been recovered.

The Comeback 

On the 30th April 2022, IVAO released their new World Servers. Aimed at resolving the short-lived server issues once and for all, the World Servers present a refreshed experience for IVAO users who will now notice a marked increase in stability and a definite performance increase. As the World Server has now replaced the older SHARD servers and comes out of its testing phase, IVAO users are now able to take examinations, undertake training and fly IVAO's World Tours on the new World Servers. IVAO continues to publish quarterly updates on the software roadmap to IVAO users which will soon see the release of Voice ATIS and Voice UNICOM.

On the 24th July 2022, IVAO released their 3rd quarter update on the software roadmap. This update focused on Voice ATIS, announced that Aurora for Mac and Linux was now in alpha testing, announced the much-anticipated release date of Voice UNICOM and the release date of the major updates coming to IVAO's MTL catalog.

On the 1st August 2022, Voice ATIS was released to IVAO users after the final round of internal testing. The use of a non-textual ATIS will significantly enhance the simulation for IVAO pilots, and controllers, and adds the next-level feature to the Voice 2.0 project.

On the 5th September 2022, IVAO announced that it was compatible with the imminent release of X-Plane 12.

On the 8th October 2022, Aurora for Mac and Linux users entered into the Open BETA phase. Allowing IVAO users more freedom to control on the devices that they prefer and use most.

On the 11th November 2022, Voice UNICOM was released for their pilot client, Altitude. All users flying on the IVAO network now benefit from UNICOM, but on voice that uses the new Voice 2.0 capabilities.

On the 16th December 2022, IVAO announced the release of their new Creator Partnership Programme which aims to provide content creators additional tools and exposure.

References

External links

Aviation websites
Microsoft Flight Simulator add-ons
Massively multiplayer online games
Flight simulation video games